Northwest Broadcasting, Inc. was a television broadcasting company based in Okemos, Michigan, United States, a suburb of Lansing. The broadcasting group owned or operated twelve television stations in six markets, through subsidiaries such as Broadcasting Communications, Mountain Communications, Stainless Broadcasting, and Bristlecone Broadcasting.

History
Northwest Broadcasting was founded in 1995 by Brian Brady to acquire the television stations of Salmon River Communications, including KAYU-TV in Spokane, Washington, K68EB in Yakima, Washington, KBWU-LP in the Tri-Cities (Richland-Kennewick-Pasco, Washington), and KMVU in Medford, Oregon. In 1997, Northwest purchased Stainless, Inc. for $17 million; while Stainless was primarily a manufacturer of broadcasting towers, the purchase also added WICZ-TV in Binghamton, New York and KTVZ in Bend, Oregon to Northwest's station group. Stainless had owned broadcast stations since purchasing WICZ (then known as WINR-TV) in 1971. Though Northwest would sell the Stainless tower company to SpectraSite Holdings in 1999 and KTVZ to News-Press & Gazette Company in 2002, it still owns WICZ-TV under the Stainless Broadcasting Company name.

Brian Brady expanded his broadcast holdings in 2002, when he teamed up with Alta Communications to acquire the K-Six Television stations under the name Eagle Creek Broadcasting; Alta had also invested in Northwest Broadcasting in 1996. Alta divested its interest in Northwest Broadcasting in 2007 and in Eagle Creek Broadcasting in 2013. During the 2010s, Brady acquired additional stations through companies such as Blackhawk Broadcasting, Bristlecone Broadcasting, and Cedar Creek Broadcasting. These companies have occasionally made joint filings with Northwest Broadcasting in Federal Communications Commission proceedings under the name "The TV Station Group."

In February 2019, Reuters reported that Apollo Global Management had agreed to acquire the entirety of Brian Brady's television portfolio, which it intends to merge with Cox Media Group (which Apollo is acquiring at the same time) and stations spun off from Nexstar Media Group's purchase of Tribune Broadcasting, once the purchases are approved by the FCC. In March 2019 filings with the Federal Communications Commission (FCC), Apollo confirmed that its newly-formed broadcasting group, Terrier Media, would acquire Northwest Broadcasting, with Brian Brady holding an unspecified minority interest in Terrier. In June 2019, it was announced that Terrier Media would instead operate as Cox Media Group, as Apollo had reached a deal to also acquire Cox's radio and advertising businesses. The transaction was completed on December 17.

Stations formerly owned by Northwest
Stations are arranged in alphabetical order by state and city of license.

Notes:
1 KYMA-DT and KSWT were owned by Blackhawk Broadcasting, which was commonly owned with Northwest Broadcasting. Throughout Northwest's ownership, both stations were operated by News-Press & Gazette Company (owner of KECY-TV) under a shared services agreement.
2 WKNT was operated by Northwest Broadcasting under a local marketing agreement with Southeastern Communications from 1997 until Northwest bought the station outright in 2000.
3 WFXW is an unused channel owned by John Wagner; Northwest Broadcasting operates the station under a local marketing agreement.
4 WNYS-TV was operated by Northwest Broadcasting operates the station under a local marketing agreement with RKM Media & Syracuse Broadcasting, from 2013 until Northwest bought the station outright in 2018. 
5 KZTV, KVTV, and KNEX-LP were owned by Eagle Creek Broadcasting, which was commonly owned with Northwest Broadcasting.
6 KFFX-TV was operated by Northwest Broadcasting under a local marketing agreement with Communication Properties from its 1999 sign-on until Northwest bought the station outright in 2003.

References

 
Defunct broadcasting companies of the United States
Defunct companies based in Lansing, Michigan
Mass media companies established in 1995
1995 establishments in Michigan
2019 disestablishments in Michigan
Mass media companies disestablished in 2019
2019 mergers and acquisitions
Cox Media Group